Shanxi Airlines was an airline based in Taiyuan in the People's Republic of China. It operated scheduled domestic passenger services. In Nov 29, 2007, it merged with China Xinhua Airlines and Chang An Airlines to form Grand China Air, a subsidiary of Hainan Airlines.

History 

The airline was established in 1988 and started operations on 6 July 2001. Hainan Airlines owned a 92.51% stake in Shanxi Airlines, acquired in a deal approved by state authorities as part of China's airline consolidation. Hainan merged the airline into Hainan Airlines in 2009.

Fleet 

The Shanxi Airlines fleet consisted of the following aircraft (at February 2006):

Accidents and incidents 
 On 7 October 1988, a Ilyushin Il-14 (registered B-2418) undergoing a sightseeing flight for workers at a local knitting factory crashed shortly after takeoff from Linfen Air Base. 44 of the 48 passengers and crew, as well as 2 pedestrians, were killed.

References

External links 

Shanxi Airlines Boeing Fleet Detail

Defunct airlines of China
Airlines established in 1998
Airlines disestablished in 2009
Transport in Shanxi
Companies based in Shanxi
Hainan Airlines
Chinese companies established in 1998
2009 disestablishments in China